The Binghamton Bearcats men's basketball team represents Binghamton University and is located in Vestal, New York. The team currently competes in the America East Conference and plays its home games at the Binghamton University Events Center. Since becoming an NCAA Division I basketball program in 2001, the team has played in one NCAA Division I men's basketball tournament in 2009.

History
Since the school's founding in 1946 until 1998 the Bearcats, originally known as the Colonials, participated in the NCAA as a Division III basketball program. From 1998 to 2001 the school was able to elevate its status as a Division II program and since has competed in the America East Conference at the Division I level. Prior to this, no school had elevated divisions faster than Binghamton.

Division I
Since moving to Division I in 2001 the Binghamton basketball team has seen rewarding successes and great disappointments. The Bearcats also have had wins against both Rutgers University and Tulane.

Following an unsuccessful 2007 season head coach Al Walker, the only coach Binghamton had held in their Division I history, stepped down. Kevin Broadus, an assistant coach for Georgetown University was signed to fill Walker's position for the 2008 season. In his second season as head coach, Broadus took the Bearcats to their first regular season conference title in school history. Binghamton subsequently defeated UMBC 61–51 in the America East tournament championship Game to make their debut in the 2009 NCAA Tournament as a 15th seed. Binghamton would lose to second-seeded Duke in the first round that year.

Following the March Madness loss, a series of incidents began to make both local and regional headlines regarding academic and ethical violations by both players and coaches of the team. By the start of the 2009–10 campaign, six players had been kicked off the team from problems stemming back to the 2008–09 season, and head coach Kevin Broadus was suspended. Despite these handicaps, the 09–10 team led by interim head coach Mark Macon managed to finish fifth in conference play with a .500 record and recorded a 13–18 overall record. Towards the end of the basketball season the SUNY system produced an audit outlining the failures of the previous administration in running the basketball team. Due to these failures, Binghamton withdrew itself from the 2010 America East men's basketball tournament. Numerous coaches and Binghamton staffers were fired as a result of the scandal.

Since then, Binghamton has been barely competitive. The 2011–12 Bearcats set a school record after beginning the season on a 26-game losing streak and finishing 2–29 for the worst winning percentage in program history. The team has yet to record a winning record in either conference or overall play.

NCAA tournament results
Binghamton has been to the tournament one time. Their combined record is 0–1.

Records

Head coaches

References

External links